Calliaster elegans is a species of starfish in the genus Calliaster.

References

External links 

Goniasteridae
Animals described in 1922